Heath Low Level railway station is one of two railway stations serving Heath, Cardiff, Wales.

Heath Low Level was opened by the Cardiff Railway in 1911. When it was opened, it was called Heath Halt station. The station has one platform with a wheelchair accessible entrance from a minor residential road. On the platform is a brick built waiting shelter and open aired benches. The station is unmanned.

Passenger services are provided by Transport for Wales as part of the Valley Lines network.

Services
Monday to Saturday daytimes, there is a half-hour service to southbound Cardiff Central and onwards to Radyr on the City Line and to Coryton northbound. Evenings there is an hourly service in each direction but there is no Sunday service.

See also
 Heath High Level railway station
 List of railway stations in Cardiff

References

External links

Railway stations in Cardiff
DfT Category F2 stations
Former Cardiff Railway stations
Railway stations in Great Britain opened in 1911
Railway stations served by Transport for Wales Rail